Brian Maloney is a Gaelic footballer who plays for St Vincents and the Mayo county team. 

Maloney formerly played with Kilmaine GAA in his native County Mayo although he has since moved to Dublin's St Vincents club. He won a Mayo Minor Football Championship medal with Kilmaine and the Junior League in 1997. He was awarded young Mayo Player of the Year in 1995. He won his first Dublin Senior Football Championship medal with St Vincents in 2007 against St Brigids at Parnell Park. He then went on to win the Leinster Senior Club Football Championship final against Tyrrellspass of Westmeath, and in 2008 won the All-Ireland Senior Club Football Championship with St Vincents in a hard-fought game.

References

Year of birth missing (living people)
Living people
Gaelic football forwards
Kilmaine Gaelic footballers
Mayo inter-county Gaelic footballers
St Vincents (Dublin) Gaelic footballers